Magnesie Award for Best Student Film is one award given to the best Czech student film.

Winners

External links

Awards for best film
Czech Lion Awards
Awards established in 2010